Instant Pleasure is Rockell's second album, released on October 10, 2000, on Robbins Entertainment. It is more pop oriented than her debut and was mostly produced by Tony Moran and Hex Hector.  The album features the hit singles "What U Did 2 Me", "Tears" and "The Dance".

Track listing

Chart positions
Singles - Billboard (North America)

2000 albums
Rockell albums